Lilydale is a rural locality in the Lockyer Valley Region, Queensland, Australia.

History 
The locality was named and bounded by Minister for Natural Resources on 18 February 2000.

References 

Lockyer Valley Region
Localities in Queensland